Lusher may refer to:

People
 Caroline Redman Lusher, British musician
 Don Lusher, British musician 
 Edwin Lusher, Australian judge
 Jeanne Lusher, American physician
 Stephen Lusher, Australian politician

Other
 Lusher Charter School, public charter school in New Orleans, Louisiana.

See also
Lush (surname)
Lush (disambiguation)
Lushi (disambiguation)

English-language surnames